William Symington was a Presbyterian minister. He took a deep interest in bible circulation, home and foreign missions, and other religious movements.

Life
William Symington was born in Paisley on June 2, 1795, a brother of Andrew Symington. In his youth he attended a private school and Paisley Academy. In 1810 he took classes at Glasgow University and spent the sessions 1814–17 at the Hall at Stirling. He was licensed by the Western Presbytery on June 30, 1818. Two calls were presented to him at the Synod of 1819: Airdrie and Stranraer — and he accepted Stranraer. He was ordained on August 18, 1819.

On a vacancy occurring in Great Hamilton Street, Glasgow he was elected on March 5 1839, although there was a considerable feeling in the Church against "transportations", and a minority was opposed to him on that account. He had already been twice chosen for West Campbell Street in the same city but the Synod had refused to present one call and he had declined the other. He was inducted on 11 July 1839. 

In 1839, he published his book, "Messiah, the Prince"; was created D.D. by the University of Edinburgh; and removed from Stranraer to Glasgow. From that time to 1862 Great Hamilton Street Church had a Christian orator for its minister. Symington was a friend of Thomas Chalmers. The proposal in the Senatus of Edinburgh University to confer the degree of D.D. on Symington was proposed by him, and seconded by David Welsh. When the Disruption came Symington sympathised largely with the movement and walked in the historical procession from St. Andrew's Church to Cannonmills. When people wondered why Symington did not then join the Free Church, he said, "With a great sum they purchased their freedom, but I was free-born." 

Symington's ministry in Glasgow resulted in an increase in the membership of the congregation, which reached nearly 1000. One of his missionaries in Glasgow was John G. Paton, D.D., afterwards of New Hebrides. On the death of his brother in 1853 he was elected to the Chair of Systematic Theology. In 1855 he was under the necessity of applying for a colleague, but it was not till March 3, 1859, that his son, William, was settled over the congregation. He died on January 28, 1862, and was buried in the necropolis of Glasgow.

Family
In 1820 he married Anne Spiers. Two sons entered the ministry — William and Alexander — and a daughter became the wife of William Henry Goold of Edinburgh. 
He married 27 June 1820, Agnes, daughter of Robert Spiers, farmer, Renfrewshire, and had issue -
Margaret Spiers (married W. H, Goold, Reformed Presbyterian Church, Edinburgh)
William, Reformed Presbyterian Church Glasgow
Robert, born 22 August, 1825 died as a result of an accident in the manse garden, died, 31 August 1833
Marion (married Matthew Clark, Glasgow)
Andrew, Glasgow, (married Felicia Colquhoun)
Alex. Macleod, Reformed Presbyterian Church, Dumfries
Agnes Anne (married William McCormick, Dumfries)

Publications
His contributions to literature included a number of fugitive pieces which he published while in Stranraer, but his chief works are The Atonement and Intercession of Jesus Christ, Edin., 1834, and Messiah the Prince, Edin., 1839. He received the degree of D.D. from Edinburgh in 1839. The 1881 edition of Messiah the Prince contains a biography of William Symington.

References

Citations

Sources

External links
 

Covenanters
19th-century Scottish clergy
Ministers of the Reformed Presbyterian Church of Scotland